Hendrik Lodewijk Drucker (Amsterdam, 11 August 1857 – The Hague, 5 September 1917) was a Dutch liberal politician of the Free-thinking Democratic League. He was the half-brother of feminist Wilhelmina Drucker.

External links
Biography on the Dutch Parliament site

1857 births
1917 deaths
Politicians from Amsterdam
Free-thinking Democratic League politicians
Members of the Senate (Netherlands)
Members of the House of Representatives (Netherlands)